Sara Leokadia Sudoł (born 13 August 1998 in Szczecin), known professionally as Young Leosia (formerly Sara) is a Polish singer, rapper, songwriter, sound engineer and DJ.

Life

Education 
She was a student of The Heroes of Monte Cassino XI Lyceum in Szczecin. When Sudoł was younger, she attended hip-hop and dancehall dance lessons. She is a graduate of the Elżbeta Zapendowska Song School. Sudoł also passed the sound production exam.

Music career 
She was working in a lot of Polish clubs (e.g. Prozak 2.0, Miłość Kredytowa, Mewa Towarzyska, Newonce Bar) as a DJ. She recorded her first songs since 2015 as Sara.

On August 6, 2020, she made her debut with single "Wyspy", which, however, went unnoticed, as did the next one called "Zakochałam się, ale zryłeś", which she recorded with the band B24.

On October 16, 2020, together with Polish rappers Żabson, Beteo and Borucci, she released the single "ULALA", which was included in the Polish streaming charts of Apple Music, iTunes and Spotify. Also in 2020, she sang as a guest in the song by Czech rapper Nik Tendo called "Loyal".

She gained the greatest popularity in 2021 thanks to the single "Szklanki", which reached the top of the Polish Apple Music and Spotify lists. She made a music video for the song, which by December 2021 was viewed almost 29 million times on YouTube. In June, she played the lead role in Mata's music video for the song "Kiss cam (podryw roku)". On August 6, she released the single "Jungle Girl", which she recorded in cooperation with Żabson. The song was on her debut EP entitled Hulanki, which was released on September 23 by Internaziomale label. On September 24, she published a music video for the song "Baila Ella", which exceeded over 15 million views on YouTube.

On March 17, 2022, Rybnik rapper Jacuś released the disco single "Piątek wieczór" featuring Young Leosia. On April 1, 2022, rapper Smolasty released "Boję Się Kochać" featuring her.

On April 21, 2022 Young Leosia and Mata (also known as Skute Bobo) have released a single featuring three songs in support of the "Fundacja420" which fights for the legalization of marijuana in Poland. On April 25, 2022 she released the single "Rok Tygrysa", the music video for which was criticized by the media as an advertisement for the Tiger energy drink.

Discography

EP

Singles

Awards and nominations

References 

1998 births
Living people
21st-century women rappers
21st-century Polish women singers
21st-century Polish singers
Polish lyricists
Polish singers
Polish rappers
Polish DJs
Musicians from Szczecin